Number one seed Lucie Hradecká defeated unseeded Ajla Tomljanović 6–1, 7–6(7–4) in the final to win the women's singles title at the inaugural Sparta Prague Open.

Seeds

Draw

Finals

Top half

Bottom half

External links 
 Main draw
 Qualifying draw

Sparta Prague Open - Singles
WTA Prague Open